Mann Sundar is an Indian drama series produced by Suzana Ghai under the banner of Panorama Entertainment. It premiered on 18 October 2021 on Dangal TV. Shruti Anand and Shivam Khajuria portrayed the characters of Ruchita and Nihar.

Plot 
Ruchita, a young woman, hopes to find a life partner who does not judge her by her outward appearance and instead loves her for her inner beauty, nature and values in life

List of episodes

Cast

Main 
 Shruti Anand as Ruchita Nihar Goyal nee Mittal; Srinath and Usha's elder daughter, Vivek's eldest sister, Nihar's wife, Ruhi and Juhi's mother (2021–present) 
 Shivam Khajuria as Nihar Naresh Goyal; Naresh and Poonam's youngest son, Prathik's younger brother, Preethi's youngest elder brother, Ruchita's first husband and Disha's second husband, Ritu's brother-in-law, Pinku's adoptive father, Ruhi and Juhi's father (2021–present)

Recurring 
 Sanjay Bhatiya as Naresh Goyal; Poonam's husband, Nihar, Preethi and Prathik's father, Daadi's son, Priya, Pinku, Ruhi and Juhi's grandfather (2021–present) 
 Aparna Ghoshal as Poonam Naresh Goyal; Naresh's wife, Nihar, Preethi and Prathik's mother, Ruchita and Ritu's mother-in-law, Priya, Pinku, Ruhi and Juhi's grandmother (2021–present) 
 Mamta Luthra as Daadi; Naresh's mother, Nihar, Preethi and Prathik's Grandmother, Poonam's mother-in-law, Ruchita and Ritu's grandmother-in-law (2021–present)
 Manisha Saxena as Ritu Prathik Goyal nee Goenka; Meera's adoptive daughter, Prathik's wife, Amrita's eldest adoptive sister, Poonam's daughter-in-law, Ruchita's sister-in-law, Priya's mother and Pinku's surrogate mother, Ruhi and Juhi's aunt (2021–present)
 Ayushi Rao as Preethi Naresh Goyal; Poonam and Naresh's long-lost daughter, Prathik and Nihar's younger sister (2022)
 Suraj Punjabi as Prathik Naresh Goyal; Poonam and Naresh's eldest son, Nihar and Preethi's elder brother, Disha's former lover, Ritu's Husband, Priya and Pinku's father, Ruhi and Juhi's uncle (2021–present)
 Pratik Parihar as Sambhav; Poonam’s nephew (2022)
 Amitabh Ghanekar as Srinath Mittal, Usha's Husband, Ruchita and Vivek's father (2021)
 Ayushi Khurana as Amrita Goenka; Meera's daughter, Ritu's younger sister, Nihar's obsessive ex-girlfriend and ex-fiancée, Ruchita's main rival (2021 - 2022)
 Unknown as Meera Goenka; Amrita's mother, Ritu's aunt and adoptive mother (2022)
 Krushag Ghuge as Vivek Srinath Mittal; Srinath and Usha's youngest son, Ruchita's younger brother (2021)
 Kajal Khanchandani as Ruchita and Vivek's Grandmother (2021-2022)(2023 - present)
 Minakshi Gupta as Sangeeta (2023)
 Geeta Bisht as Usha Srinath Mittal; Srinath's husband, Ruchita and Vivek's mother (2021)
 Asmi Deo as Priya Prathik Goyal; Prathik and Ritu's daughter (2021 - present)
 Palak Jain as Ruchita's friend (2021)
 Sampark Lele as Nihar's friend (2021)
 Unknown as Bua Sa, Naresh's great grandmother, Prathik and Nihar's grandmother, Ruchita, Ritu, Poonam's grandmother-in-law (2022)
 Shivanshi Das as Aanchal Meghwal; Tai Maa's daughter, Nihar's ex-fiance and obsessive lover, Ruchita's one of the Main Rival (2022)
 Ekta Sharma as Tai Maa; Aanchal's mother (2022)
 Riya Gupta as Rithika Ahuja (2023)
 Priyanka Shukla as Disha Nihar Goyal; Prathik's former love interest, Pinku's mother, Nihar's obsessive lover-turned-second wife, Ruchita's main Rival (2023 - present)
 Kavirr Amoli as Pinku Prathik Goyal; Prathik and Disha's son; Nihar's adoptive son, Ruhi and Juhi's cousin (2023 - present)
 Ayanshi Sharma as Baby Pinku (2023)
 Yashasvi Prajapati as Ruhi Nihar Goyal; Nihar and Ruchita's elder daughter, Juhi's elder sister, Pinku's cousin (2023 - present)
 Roneisha Sharma as Juhi Nihar Goyal; Nihar and Ruchita's younger daughter; Ruhi's younger sister, Pinku's cousin (2023 - present)
 Ali Abbas as Rakesh Chauhan/Thief (2023)

Cameo appearances 
 Chahat Pandey as Mahua Aryan Mishra from Nath – Zewar Ya Zanjeer (2022)
 Aditi Mishra as Krishna Aryan Mishra from Nath – Zewar Ya Zanjeer (2023)
 Vaibhavi Hankare as Mishri "Anu" Arjun Awasthi from Sindoor Ki Keemat (2023)
 Aleya Ghosh as Paro Shankar Rana from Ishq Ki Dastaan - Naagmani (2023)

References

External links 
 
 Mann Sundar on Dangal Play 

2021 Indian television series debuts
Indian drama television series
Hindi-language television shows
Television shows set in Mumbai
Indian television soap operas
Indian television series
Serial drama television series
Dangal TV original programming